Będziechowo  is a village in the administrative district of Gmina Główczyce, within Słupsk County, Pomeranian Voivodeship, in northern Poland.

The village has a population of 141.

References

Villages in Słupsk County